Yunfa (reigned 1801–1808) was a king of the Hausa city-state of Gobir in what is now Nigeria.  He is particularly remembered for his conflict with Islamic reformer Usman dan Fodio.

Nephew and designated heir of Bawa, Yunfa appears to have been taught by Fulani religious leader Usman dan Fodio as a young man.  Though dan Fodio helped Yunfa succeed Nafata to the throne in 1801, the two soon came into conflict over dan Fodio's proposed religious reforms.  Fearing dan Fodio's growing power, Yunfa summoned him and attempted to assassinate him in person; however, Yunfa's pistol backfired and wounded him in the hand. After this failure, Yunfa allowed dan Fodio and his companions to leave.

In late 1803, Yunfa seized some Muslim captives at Gimbana, but when the captives passed dan Fodio's hometown of Degel, the religious leader somehow managed to have them released. When his demands to have the captives returned were ignored, Yunfa threatened to destroy Degel. In response, dan Fodio and his followers fled to Gudu in February 1804.

Dan Fodio soon called for help from other Fulani nomad groups, and declared himself the imam of a new caliphate in jihad against Gobir.  A widespread uprising soon began across Hausaland, and in 1804, Yunfa appealed to rulers of neighboring city-states for aid.  In December of that year, Yunfa won a major victory in the Battle of Tsuntua, in which Dan Fodio's forces were said to have lost 2,000 men, 200 of whom knew the Koran by heart.

However, dan Fodio soon launched a successful campaign against Kebbi and established a permanent base at Gwandu.   In October 1808, the jihadists seized the Gobir capital of Alkalawa and killed Yunfa.

References

"Uthman dan Fodio."  Encyclopædia Britannica Online, accessed October 1, 2005.
Daniel, F. "Shehu dan Fodio." Journal of the Royal African Society 25.99 (Apr 1926): 278–283.

History of Nigeria
Sokoto Caliphate
Year of birth missing
18th-century births
18th-century Nigerian people
19th-century Nigerian people
1808 deaths